A U.S. Air Force military training leader (MTL) is a non-commissioned officer with specific duties. They are assigned the duty of transitioning non-prior service airmen in the Air Force into the personal adjustment to military life. The MTLs' main responsibility is to continue the training the airman has learned in basic military training.

MTL history
The military training leader (8B100) career field has undergone numerous changes to make it what it is today.  Student training advisor (STA) first started around 1973 as 99128's.  At that time they were combined with the military training instructors and then split to their own AFSC (99138) in 1975. In late 1991 the name was changed to military training manager.

In October 1998, Chief Master Sergeant Doug Hodge changed the name to military training leader. This name was created as a more descriptive way to explain the duties of this position. Showing how leadership was paramount in this position. Being able to show leadership is what being an MTL is all about.

Another change to the program was the creation of a Command MTL position at 2 Air Force on 7 Aug 1997.  Command MTLs are the OPR for all NPS military training programs and responsible for the selection and training of all assigned MTLs.

Prior to a phase program airmen went from basic military training's very structured, controlled environment to a "no rules" tech school environment; discipline problems were common.

Phase programs were instituted at several tech-training locations in the early 80's, but a standardized MAJCOM directed phase program was not implemented until 1996; a MAJCOM directed phase program was implemented 1983 (est.)

AETCI 36-2216, Administration of Military Standards and Discipline Training, directs the phase program.

MTL Mission: To adapt NPS airmen to military life and provide the Air Force with highly trained, motivated, self-disciplined, and physically fit airmen with exceptional military bearing.

Unlike the Army, the Air Force uses a different specialist (MTLs) to continue military training during advanced individual or technical training.

What we know now as Military Training Leaders was created in 1973.

Over the years the name has changed but the responsibilities has increased.

Student Training Advisor 1973-1992

Military Training Manager 1992-1998

Military Training Leader 1998 – present

CONUS locations with Military Training Leaders: (as of September 2009):

Most people are unaware of how many locations in the CONUS there are Military Training Leaders assigned. There are over 37 locations. The bases under the bold indicate the Detachment or Geographically Separated Unit.

Headquarters Second Air Force, Keesler Air Force Base
Goodfellow Air Force Base
Presidio of Monterrey (Army Base), California
Naval Air Station Pensacola Corry Station (Navy Base), Florida
Fort Huachuca (Army Base), Arizona

Lackland Air Force Base
Kirtland Air Force Base, New Mexico
Hurlburt Field, Florida
Naval Support Activity Panama City, Florida
Pope Air Force Base, North Carolina
Camp Bullis (Army Base), Texas
Port of Hueneme (Navy Base), California

Keesler Air Force Base
Fort George G. Meade (Army Base), Maryland
Fort Gordon (Army Base), Georgia

Sheppard Air Force Base
Marine Corps Air Station New River (Marine Base), North Carolina
Fort Eustis (Army Base), Virginia
Aberdeen Proving Grounds (Army Base), Maryland
Naval Air Station Pensacola (Navy Base), Florida
Eglin Air Force Base, Florida
NCBC Gulfport (Navy Base), Mississippi
Fort Leonard Wood (Army Base), Missouri
Tyndall Air Force Base, Florida
Davis-Montan Air Force Base, Arizona
Luke Air Force Base, Arizona
Beale Air Force Base, California
Dover Air Force Base, DE
Little Rock Air Force Base, Arkansas
Charleston Air Force Base, South Carolina
Tinker Air Force Base, Oklahoma
McChord Air Force Base, Washington
Fort Sam Houston, Texas

Vandenberg Air Force Base, Calironia

Headquarters Nineteenth Air Force, Randolph Air Force Base
Altus Air Force Base, Oklahoma
Kirtland Air Force Base, New Mexico
Little Rock Air Force Base, Arkansas
Fairchild Air Force Base, Washington
Randolph Air Force Base, Texas

Air Force Materiel Command, Wright-Patterson Air Force Base
Wright-Patterson Air Force Base, Ohio

59th Medical Wing, Lackland Air Force Base
Lackland Air Force Base, Texas

Military training leader photo gallery

References

Military Training Leader Association

About.com

Military ranks of the United States
Military education and training